Hybomitra auripila is a Palearctic species of horse fly in the family Tabanidae.

Distribution
Europe

References

Tabanidae
Diptera of Europe
Taxa named by Johann Wilhelm Meigen
Insects described in 1820